The official and historical coat of arms or 'full heraldic achievement' for UK schools, as granted by the College of Arms or Lyon Court, are presented herewith.

Schools in England

See Armorial of schools in England

Schools in Northern Ireland

Schools in Scotland

{| class=wikitable style=font-size:95%
|- style="vertical-align:top; text-align:center;"
! style="width:206px;"| Image
! Details

|- valign=top
|align=center | 
| Denny High, granted 22 April 1965
Escutcheon: Parted per pale, dexter, per fess Azure and Vert, between a fess enarched Argent, masoned Sable, a demi-angel issuant from the fess Proper, attired Argent, celestially crowned and wings elevated Or, and in base a pale wavy Argent charged of two pallets wavy Azure; sinister, Argent, between a roundel embattled Sable voided of the field, in the honour point and a cinquefoil Gules in base, two palm branches slipped saltirewise Vert, and in chief an open book Or, fore-edges and binding Gules.
Motto: Summa Peto (Aim High)

|- valign=top
|align=center | 
| Dundee High, granted 21 April 1938
Escutcheon: 1st Gules, a celestial crown Or. 2nd Azure, the crosier of the Abbot of Lindores Or, surmounted of a saltire couped Argent. 3rd Azure a pot of three growing lilies Argent. 4th Or, a Doric Portico of four columns sable.
Motto: Prestante Domino (With God As Our Guide)

|- valign=top
|align=center | 
| Fettes, granted 16 December 1916
Escutcheon: Or, a chevron between two mullets in chief and a cross crosslet fitched in base Gules.
Crest: A bee volant Proper.
Supporters: On the dexter side a lion Gules and on the sinister a stag Proper, gorged with a collar to which is affixed a chain passing between the fore legs and reflexed over the back Or.
Motto: Industria (Work Hard)|- valign=top
|align=center | 
| George Heriot's, granted 3 January 1917 (adopted from arms of school founder)
Escutcheon: Argent, on a fess Azure three cinquefoils of the field, in base a mullet Sable.Crest: A cornucopia Proper.Motto: I Distribute Chearfullie|- valign=top
|align=center | 
| Glasgow Academy, granted at unknown date
Escutcheon:  The Bishop's Mitre of Saint Mungo on the upper left to represent the City of Glasgow, the Lion which represents Scotland on the upper right, the torch of learning on the lower right and three crosses of sacrifice chosen to recall "the perpetual mainspring of the school, the spirit of sacrifice and service" on the lower left. The school colours are heraldically represented originally as azure (blue) and argent (silver).Motto: Serva Fidem (Keep the Faith)|- valign=top
|align=center | 
| Glasgow High, granted 9 February 1919
Escutcheon: Argent, on a mount in base an oak tree, the stem at the base surmounted of a salmon on its back with a signet ring in its mouth, on the top of the tree a redbreast and in the sinister fess point an ancient hand bell proper, on a chief Gules an open book also proper, leaved or between two wreaths of laurel Gold.Motto: Sursum Semper (Always Aim High)|- valign=top
|align=center | 
| Trinity, Glenalmond, granted 15 September 1898
Escutcheon: Silver saltire cross on the blue ground of Saint Andrew, the national arms of Scotland. The fleur-de-lys is the emblem of the Trinity, while the sun and crescents are taken from the arms of Lothian and Buccleuch respectively. Motto: Soirbheachadh le Gleann Anuinn (Prosperity be to Glenalmond)|- valign=top
|align=center |  
| Gordonstoun, granted 9 August 1957
Escutcheon: Or a Lymphad contournée ramheaded and fishtail enarched Vert biremed oars Gules and under square-sail proper upon a sea in base wavy intradented Argent and Azure.Motto: Plus Et En Vous (There is more in you)|- valign=top
|align=center | 
| Keith Grammar, granted 18 January 1966
Escutcheon: Tierced in pairle reversed; 1st, per pale dexter bendy of six Or and Azure within a bordure Gules; sinister Argent, an antique crown in chief Gules and a martlet in base Azure, on a chief of the last three fleurs-de-lys Or; 2nd, Argent, a lion passant guardant Gules, imperially crowned Or; 3rd, Vert, an escallop Or; and over all upon a chief Or three open books Proper, binding and fore-edges Azure.Motto: Do Ut Dus (I give in order that you may give)|- valign=top
|align=center | 
| Merchiston Castle School, granted at unknown date
Escutcheon: Argent, a saltire engrailed between three roses gules and open book proper. Crest — A hand proper, holding a crescent or.Motto: Ready Ay Ready|- valign=top
|align=center | 
| Queen Anne High, granted 21 August 1965
Escutcheon: Per pale indented, dexter, Azure, upon a rock in base a tower Argent, masoned Sable, windows and port Gules, supported by two lions rampant of the Second, langued of the Fourth, all demidiated; Sinister, per fess Or and Gules, a lion passant Azure, langued Gules in chief, powdered by six hearts of the last, all in chief, and in base an open book Proper, binding and fore-edges Azure. Motto: Libertatem Per Probiatatem (Freedom by Integrity)|- valign=top
|align=center | 
| Queensferry High, granted 16 February 1970
Escutcheon: Azure, a cross flory between four martlets Or, on a chief Argent three primroses Gules.Motto: Mente et Manu (With Mind and Hand)|- valign=top
|align=center | 
| Royal High, granted 1920
Escutcheon: Sable, a castle triple towered and embattled argent, masoned of the first, windows and doors open gules set upon a rock proper. Motto: Musis Respublica Floret (The State Flourishes with the Muses) 

|- valign=top
|align=center | 
| St George's, granted 1988
Escutcheon: On a shield of oval form Argent, on a cross cotised Gules a torteau fimbriated Argent charged of the figure of St. George riding to the sinister and slaying a dragon of the First, in dexter chief a torch endlamed of the Second and in an Escrol below the same this.Motto: TROUTHE AND HONOUR, FREEDOM AND CURTEISYE|- valign=top
|align=center | 
| Tynecastle High, granted 31 May 1966
Escutcheon: Per pale Argent and Azure, a castle of two towers flagged each with postern and window, and portcullis raised, all counterchanged, and in chief a rose also counterchanged, and in base a crescent likewise counterchanged. |}

Schools in Wales

See also
Armorial of UK universities
Armorial of county councils of England

References

Further reading
 Scholastic arms; the arms, crests or badges used by four hundred schools, colleges, and universities: Beaulah, G. K, 1936, Manchester
 Armorial bearings of British schools'': Christie-Murray, David, and Escott, Dan [1967?], Cambridge.

Armorials of the United Kingdom
Schools in Northern Ireland
Schools in Scotland
Schools in Wales